Minnesota State Highway 64 (MN 64) is a  highway in north-central Minnesota, which runs from its         
intersection with State Highway 210 in Motley and continues north to its northern terminus at its intersection with State Highway 200 near Laporte and Kabekona.

Determined as an important alternate route to congestion-plagued Highway 371, this road has been designated a Minnesota Regional Corridor along its entire length.

Route description
State Highway 64 serves as a north–south route in north-central Minnesota between Motley, Akeley, and Hendrickson Township.

Highway 64 passes through the following forests:

Foot Hills State Forest in Cass County
Badoura State Forest in southeast Hubbard County 
Paul Bunyan State Forest in Hubbard County

This route is often used by motorists as a shortcut between Bemidji and the Twin Cities to avoid congestion on nearby Highway 371.  Highway 64 parallels Highway 371.

U.S. Highway 10 is four blocks from the southern terminus of Highway 64 in Motley at State Highway 210.

History
Highway 64 was authorized between Motley and Akeley in 1933. The part of the route from Akeley to State Highway 200 was authorized in 1949, but not constructed until the mid-1960s.

Highway 64 was still a primitive road in 1940. The original section was completely paved by the late 1950s. The section of the route between Akeley and Highway 200 was built as a new road by 1965.

Highway 64 was reconstructed in 1998 between its junctions with State Highway 87. A sharp 90 degree turn along this stretch was smoothed out, and the road widened through a swampy area that had steep dropoffs on either side leading to water-filled ditches.

Major intersections

References

064
Transportation in Cass County, Minnesota
Transportation in Hubbard County, Minnesota